The Catholic Institute of West Africa (CIWA) is a tertiary educational institution in Port Harcourt, Rivers State, Nigeria. It is a higher ecclesiastical institute of the Catholic Church and remains the leading theological facility in West Africa.

History
Established in 1981, the institute opened its doors with 8 students, 8 academic and administrative staff with Monsignor Stephen Ezeanya as its first rector. Ezeanya was later appointed as Archbishop of Onitsha. In 1982, the institute relocated to its present site at 2nd Artillery, Rumuibekwe. Its current proprietor is the Regional Episcopal Conference of West Africa (RECOWA).

According to the institution's website, the Catholic Institute of West Africa has "assisted thousands of students in discovering and nurturing their call to Christian service, gaining a deeper understanding of Christianity and religion, and its role in a changing world." In September 2014, CIWA regained possession of its campus at Obehie in Abia State. The campus had been temporarily used by Veritas University prior to its permanent relocation that year.

Administrative structure
At the administrative level, the institute consists of the following members: 
 Rector: Very Rev. Msgr. Prof. Sylvanus I. Udoidem
 Registrar: Rev. Fr. P. I. Okonkwo
 Bursar: Peter Agada
 Librarians: Kelechi Victor Aguocha, Grace O. Nnodim 
 Library Assistant: Mr. Samuel Wada 
 Library Attendants: Mr. Azuka ThankGod C. and Mrs. Elochukwu

Academics

Departments
Several academic departments offer a range of courses at different levels from certificate to Licenciate and PhD. These departments include:
 Biblical Studies 
 Systematic Theology 
 Center for Studies of African Culture and Communications (CESACC)
 Sacred Liturgy 
 Canon Law
 Pastoral/Spirituality 
 Moral Theology

Libraries
The institute has well-equipped libraries at both Port Harcourt and Obehie campuses. The CIWA Main Library in Port Harcourt is managed by a committee, two professional librarians and three assistants. There's internet access to aid research as well as other studies. Contents of the library are updated regularly to keep up with theological trends and developments.

References

Further reading
 Nkem Hyginus M. V. Chigere. Foreign Missionary Background and Indigenous Evangelization in Igboland. LIT Verlag Münster, 2001. 
 This is the Catholic Institute of West Africa (CIWA), Port Harcourt, Rivers State, Nigeria: Insights and Projects. CIWA, 1989
 Christian Ndubueze Anyanwu. Creative Strategies for Conflict Management & Community Building. AuthorHouse, 2009.

External links

  – CIWA homepage
 Regional Episcopal Conference of West Africa – GCatholic.org

Universities and colleges in Port Harcourt
Educational institutions established in 1981
1981 establishments in Nigeria
1980s establishments in Rivers State
Catholic universities and colleges in Rivers State